Assū is the seventh month of the Nanakshahi calendar, which governs the Sikh tradition. This month coincides with Ashvin in the Hindu calendar and the Indian national calendar, and September and October in the Gregorian and Julian calendars and is 30 days long.

Important events during this month

September
September 15 (1 Assu) - The start of the month Assu 
September 16 (2 Assu) - Joti Jot of Guru Amar Das Ji 
September 16 (2 Assu) - Gur Gadi of Guru Ram Das Ji
September 16 (2 Assu) - Joti Jot of Guru Ram Das Ji
September 16 (2 Assu) - Gur Gadi of Guru Arjan Dev Ji
September 18 (4 Assu) - Gur Gadi of Guru Angad Dev Ji 
September 22 (8 Assu) - Joti Jot of Guru Nanak Dev Ji

October

October 9 (25 Assu) -  Birth of Guru Ram Das Ji
October 15 (1 Katak) -  The end of the month Assu and the start of Katak

See also
Punjabi calendar

External links
www.srigranth.org SGGS Page 133
www.sikhcoalition.org

Months of the Nanakshahi calendar
Sikh terminology